Nipawin is a town in Saskatchewan, Canada, on the Saskatchewan River portion of Tobin Lake. The town lies between Codette Lake, created by the Francois-Finlay Dam (built in 1986) and Tobin Lake, created by the E.B. Campbell Dam built in 1963, renamed from Squaw Rapids. The construction of Francois-Finlay Dam earned Nipawin the nickname the "Town of Two Lakes".

Nipawin is bordered by the Rural Municipality of Nipawin No. 487 and the Rural Municipality of Torch River No. 488 (the latter across the Saskatchewan River).

Highway 35 and Highway 55 intersect in Nipawin. The Nipawin Airport and the Nipawin Water Aerodrome also serve the community.

Nipawin is a Cree word meaning "a bed, or resting place" which referred to a low-lying area along the river now flooded by Codette Lake where First Nations women and children would camp and wait for the men to arrive.

History

The first permanent settlement of Nipawin occurred in 1910 with the establishment of a trading post. In 1924 the Canadian Pacific Railway passed nearby over the Crooked Bridge, and the settlement was moved, building by building, to its current location to be closer to the railway.

Fur trade
There were a number of fur trading posts in the area, but they are poorly documented. In 1763 Joseph Smith reached the area from York Factory. In 1768 James Finlay from Montreal built a post. François le Blanc, apparently the man known as "Saswe", had a post by that year or the next. In 1790 William Thorburn built here and next year moved to Hungry Hall. In 1795 there were two posts, one run by A. N McLeod for the North West Company and another run by James Porter working for David Grant.

Recent history
On April 18, 2008, a downtown meat shop exploded, destroying three buildings as well as damaging several more. The explosion killed two and injured five. The explosion is suspected to have been caused by a backhoe that snagged and sheared a natural gas riser from the main line. The explosion prompted the implementation of a state of emergency by the mayor. The explosion received  extensive national news coverage.

Demographics 

Climate

Nipawin Experiences a Humid continental climate (Koppen: Dfb) bordering on a subarctic climate (Dfc), with long, extremely cold winters and short, warm summers.

Economy
Nipawin is near the Fort à la Corne Provincial Forest, location of the world's largest diamond bearing kimberlites and intensive diamond exploration activity.  Other industries in the area include: agriculture, tourism, canola oil processing, honey production, forestry, and commercialization of second-generation biofuels.

Attractions
This resort community has become a destination for fishing, camping, boating, golfing, hunting and outdoor recreation. 
Nipawin hosts several annual fishing events, including, the Great Northern Pike Festival, a summer-long event offering prizes for catching tagged fish. Other annual fishing events are the Codette Walleye tournament, Ladies Fish for Freedom tournament, Premier's Walleye Cup tournament, and the Vanity Cup Walleye tournament running the last weekend in September and the first week in October.
The name Nipawin was also given to Nipawin Regional Park, a large recreational area a few kilometres northwest of the town. 
Nipawin is also home to a beautifully landscaped 18-hole golf course.  It has been rated as one of the top 100 public courses in Canada and one of the top five in Saskatchewan.  Annual events held at the Evergreen Golf Club are Bob Dow Memorial Golf Tournament and the Evergreen Classic Golf Tournament along with many other tournaments throughout the golf season.
Nipawin is located along the Trans-Canada Snowmobile Trail.  There are many other groomed trails that run around Nipawin along with snowmobile rallies.

Sports
Curling is also found in Nipawin for the young and old.  Nipawin hosts the Ladies, Men's and Seniors Bonspiels and the Evergreen Curling Classic.
The town is home to the Nipawin Hawks of the Saskatchewan Junior Hockey League.

Education
Nipawin has three public schools: Central Park Elementary School, Wagner Elementary School, and L.P. Miller Comprehensive School.

The town is home to the Nipawin Campus of Cumberland College with 360 students and Nipawin Bible College with 48 students.

Notable residents
Sharon Butala, novelist
Dane Byers, NHL hockey player
Lyndon Byers, retired NHL player for the Boston Bruins
Greg Classen, retired hockey player who played 82 games in the NHL for the Nashville Predators
James Archibald Kiteley, provincial politician
Arthur McKay, painter and professor
Dave Pagan, professional baseball pitcher

See also
List of place names in Canada of Indigenous origin

References

External links

Towns in Saskatchewan
Hudson's Bay Company trading posts
Pedlars (fur trade)
Populated places established in 1910
1910 establishments in Saskatchewan
Division No. 14, Saskatchewan
Populated places on the Saskatchewan River